Victor Baluda and Alexander Kudryavtsev took the title, beating Brydan Klein and Nikola Mektić 6–2, 4–6, [10–3]

Seeds

Draw

Draw

References
 Main Draw

Doubles
Open Castilla y León doubles
2014 ATP Challenger Tour